George D. Behrakis (born January 1, 1934) is a Greek-American retired entrepreneur and philanthropist who has contributed to many organizations and establishments in the previous decades. He is best known for his donation to the Museum of Fine Arts in Boston, Massachusetts, and for the building of Northeastern University's College of Health Sciences. He is a retired pharmacist, medicine researcher and businessman.

Biography
Behrakis was born on January 1, 1934, in Lowell, MA, of Greek-American nationality. He attended Lowell High School and later Northeastern University, where he earned a degree in pharmaceuticals.

He married his wife Margo Behrakis in 1961. They have four children and nine grandchildren.

Pharmaceuticals
In 1959 Behrakis became a salesperson for major pharmacy company (McNeil) Johnson and Johnson, where he and his team marketed Tylenol. A true entrepreneur he went on to start his own company, Dooner Laboratories. After selling it nine years later, he purchased Muro Pharmaceuticals, which first worked on skin and eye products and later moved on to asthma and immunology products. With Behrakis, as the head, Muro was highly successful, and he sold the company in 1996. He remained on the board for two additional years, retiring in 1998.

Philanthropy
After retiring from the pharmaceutical business in 1998, Behrakis began an extensive career in philanthropy with his focus on education, Greek Art, Healthcare, Hellenic religion and culture.

Northeastern Pharmacy School
On October 12, 2000, groundbreaking work began on the new Northeastern Health and Sciences Center after Behrakis and his wife donated money to build an 84,000 square foot complex that would become the most modern health sciences center in the country. Construction was completed in 2003. The building still stands today as one of the most advanced science centers in the country.

Museum of Fine Arts
In mid-2009, Behrakis and his wife made a major donation to the Museum of Fine Arts (MFA) to add new exhibits on ancient civilizations such as Ancient Greece, Rome and Egypt.

Leadership 100
Behrakis has for many years been a member of Leadership 100, an organization that helps raise money for the Hellenic Society. Two of his children, Drake and Stephanie, along with their spouses, are also members of the program. Behrakis has made a huge difference in the Leadership program by donating money and serving as president and chairman for many years. The Leadership conference is scheduled every February.

Anti-Smoking Campaign in Greece
Behrakis also provided funding and personal involvement along with Harvard University towards a national anti-smoking campaign in Greece alongside the Hellenic Cancer Society and Panagiotis Behrakis, MD, a well-respected pulmonary physician in Greece.

Other organizations
Behrakis and his wife are also part of many other organizations such as the National Hellenic Society and the Alpha Omega Greek organization. George was also on the board of Trustees at Tufts, Northeastern, Brigham and Women's Hospital and the Boys & Girls Club of Greater Lowell. In May 2012, Behrakis received an honorary degree from the Hellenic College in Boston, and in June was given another at Drexel University in Philadelphia. In September 2014, Behrakis, was presented with the Greek Heritage Award by The American College of Greece, recognizing his contribution to promoting Hellenism. In 2019, Mr Behrakis was honored by the Greek government with a stamp of his picture denoting his contribution to his anti-smoking campaign in the country.

References 

1934 births
Living people
American pharmacists
American people of Greek descent
Northeastern University alumni
People from Lowell, Massachusetts